Asbury Coward (September 19, 1835 - April 28, 1925) was a school leader, Confederate Army officer, South Carolina Superintendent of Education, and Superintendent of The Citadel.

He was born on the Quenby Plantation outside Charleston, South Carolina, and graduated from South Carolina Military Academy (now The Citadel) in 1854. He and classmate Micah Jenkins established the King's Mountain Military School in Yorkville in 1855. It closed at the start of the American Civil War. It reopened after the war but the boarding school struggled with the challenging times and closed.

During the Civil War, Coward was commissioned as a colonel and served under General James Longstreet in Tennessee and Georgia.

He served as president of the Kings Mountain, North Carolina, centennial committee.

In 1890, Coward was named Superintendent of The Citadel. He remained in that office until 1908 and died in 1925. He is buried at Rosehill Cemetery in York County.

The Daughters of the American Revolution erected a monument honoring him at Kings Mountain National Military Park in Blacksburg. The Citadel has a collection of his letters. Winthrop University has a small collection of his letters. His memoir was published in 1968.

References

External links
Find a Grave entry

1835 births
1925 deaths
The Citadel, The Military College of South Carolina alumni
The Citadel, The Military College of South Carolina faculty
Confederate States Army officers
People from Charleston, South Carolina
South Carolina Superintendent of Education